Jan, JaN or JAN may refer to:

Acronyms
 Jackson, Mississippi (Amtrak station), US, Amtrak station code JAN
 Jackson-Evers International Airport, Mississippi, US, IATA code
 Jabhat al-Nusra (JaN), a Syrian militant group
 Japanese Article Number, a barcode standard compatible with EAN
 Japanese Accepted Name, a Japanese nonproprietary drug name
 Job Accommodation Network, US, for people with disabilities
 Joint Army-Navy, US standards for electronic color codes, etc.
 Journal of Advanced Nursing

Personal name
 Jan (name), male variant of John, female shortened form of Janet and Janice
 Jan (Persian name), Persian word meaning 'life', 'soul', 'dear'; also used as a name
 Ran (surname), romanized from Mandarin as Jan in Wade–Giles
 Ján, Slovak name

Other uses
 January, as an abbreviation for the first month of the year in the Gregorian calendar
 Jan (cards), a term in some card games when a player loses without taking any tricks or scoring a minimum number of points
 Jan (comic book writer), pseudonym of Spanish comic book artist Juan López Fernández  
 Jan Mayen, Norwegian island in the Arctic Ocean
 "Jan", a WIGS-produced YouTube drama
"Jan", a short film produced by Amos Yee